Rhizobacter is a bacterial genus from the class Betaproteobacteria order Burkholderiales. It is a plant pathogenic bacterium and, like a few other phytopathogenic bacteria, produces tumors in infected plants. It appears to have an extremely wide host range, producing tumors (galls) on the roots, stems and tubers of at least 46 species of plants from 24 families, which includes many economically important species such as tomato (Solanum lycopersicum) and cabbage (Brassica oleracea).

References

Pseudomonadales
Bacteria genera